Szwajcaria Kaszubska (Kaszëbskô Szwajcariô, Kashubian and ) (literally: Kashubian Switzerland) is the northern region of the Kashubian Lake District. In the region of the Kashubian Switzerland is located the highest point in the Polish Lowland (Niż Polski) - Wieżyca (329 metres above sea level). 

Main rivers: Radunia, Łeba, Słupia and Wierzyca.

References

See also 
 Regions whose name incorporates "Switzerland"

Kashubia